Luxolo Koza (born 18 September 1994) is a South African professional rugby union player for the  in the Currie Cup and the Rugby Challenge. He is a utility forward, but has mainly played as a loosehead prop in first class rugby.

Career

Eastern Province

As a scholar at Muir College in Uitenhage, Koza was selected to represent Eastern Province at the Under-18 Craven Week tournament. He earned a selection for both the 2011 tournament held in Kimberley and the 2012 tournament held in Port Elizabeth, mainly playing as a lock for Eastern Province.

In both these seasons, he also represented the s in the annual Under-19 Provincial Championship. In 2011, he made three appearances but could not prevent Eastern Province finish rock bottom of Division B. He appeared on two occasions in 2012 – now mainly playing as a loose forward – as  reached the final of the competition where they lost to near neighbours .

Griquas

After finishing school, Koza moved to Kimberley to join  for the 2013 season.

His first class debut came for  during the 2014 Vodacom Cup competition.

Griquas went on to win the qualification tournament and clinch a spot in the 2014 Currie Cup Premier Division, but Koza played no part in that competition, instead reverting to the  side where he started all seven of his side's matches during the 2014 Under-21 Provincial Championship.

Pumas

References

South African rugby union players
Living people
1994 births
Rugby union players from Port Elizabeth
Rugby union props
Rugby union locks
Rugby union flankers
Rugby union number eights
Griquas (rugby union) players
SWD Eagles players
Falcons (rugby union) players
Eastern Province Elephants players